Three ships of the United States Navy have been named Atlas,  after Atlas, whose name means bearer or endurer.

 , held that name only briefly before being renamed Nahant on 10 August 1869.
 , was a schooner seized by United States Customs officials at San Francisco from her German owners in 1917.
 , was laid down on 3 June 1943 and launched on 19 October 1943.

Sources
 

United States Navy ship names